KSCK-LP is a Classic Country formatted broadcast radio station licensed to Sterling City, Texas, serving Metro Sterling City.  KSCK-LP is owned and operated by Concho Valley Fellowship.  The first person to oversee operations and manage the station is Rickey Green 2013–present.

References

External links
 

2014 establishments in Texas
Classic country radio stations in the United States
Radio stations established in 2014
SCK-LP